The following is an incomplete list of financial regulatory authorities by country.

List

A-B
 Afghanistan - Da Afghanistan Bank (DAB) 
 Albania - Albanian Financial Supervisory Authority (FSA) 
 Algeria - Commission d'Organisation et de Surveillance des Opérations de Bourse (COSOB) 
 Andorra - Andorran Financial Authority (AFA) 
 Anguilla - Anguilla Financial Services Commission 
 Antigua & Barbuda - Financial Services Regulatory Commission 
 Argentina -  (CNV) 
 Armenia - Central Bank of Armenia (CBA) 
 Australia:
 Reserve Bank of Australia
 Australian Prudential Regulation Authority (APRA)
 Australian Securities and Investments Commission (ASIC) 
 Australian Takeovers Panel 
 Foreign Investments Review Board  (FIRB) 
 Australian Transaction Reports and Analysis Centre (AUSTRAC) 
 Austria:
 Financial Market Authority (FMA, Finanzmarktaufsichtsbehörde in German) 
 Oesterreichische Nationalbank 
 Austrian Takeover Commission  (Übernahmekommission in German) 
 Azerbaijan:
 Financial Market Supervisory Authority of Azerbaijan ;
 Bahamas:
 Central Bank of The Bahamas 
 Securities Commission of the Bahamas
 Bahrain - Central Bank of Bahrain 
 Bangladesh:
 Bangladesh Bank 
 Securities and Exchange Commission (Bangladesh) 
 Barbados:
 Barbados Financial Services Commission 
 Central Bank of Barbados 
 Financial Intelligence Unit (Barbados) 
 Belarus:
 National Bank of the Republic of Belarus
 Belgium:
 Financial Services and Markets Authority (FSMA - Autorité des services et marchés financiers/Authoriteit voor Financiële Diensten en Markten) 
  National Bank of Belgium (NBB - Banque Nationale de Belgique/Nationale Bank van België) 
 Belize - International Financial Services Commission 
 Bermuda - Bermuda Monetary Authority 
 Bhutan - Royal Monetary Authority of Bhutan (RMA)
 Bolivia - Autoridad de Supervisión del Sistema Financiero (ASFI) 
 Bosnia and Herzegovina:
 Republika Srpska Securities Commission for Republika Srpska
 Securities Commission of the Federation of Bosnia and Herzegovina ("Komisija za vrijednosne papire Federacije Bosne i Hercegovine")
 Botswana:
Non-Bank Financial Institutions Regulatory Authority (NBFIRA)
Bank of Botswana (BOB)
 Brazil:
Central Bank of Brazil (BACEN, Banco Central do Brasil in Portuguese)
Securities and Exchange Commission of Brazil (CVM, Comissão de Valores Mobiliários in Portuguese)
Superintendency of Private Insurance (SUSEP, Superintendência de Seguros Privados in Portuguese)
 British Virgin Islands - British Virgin Islands Financial Services Commission 
 Brunei - Brunei International Financial Center of the Ministry of Finance 
 Bulgaria - Financial Supervision Commission (Bulgaria) (FSC)

C-D
 Cambodia
National Bank of Cambodia (NBC)
Non-bank Financial Services Authority
 Canada:
 Bank of Canada
 Canada Deposit Insurance Corporation
 Office of the Superintendent of Financial Institutions (OSFI) 
 Financial Transactions and Reports Analysis Centre of Canada (FINTRAC) 
 Financial Consumer Agency of Canada
 Canadian Securities Administrators (CSA) 
 Alberta Securities Commission
 Autorité des marchés financiers - Québec
 British Columbia Securities Commission (BCSC) 
 Ontario Securities Commission (OSC) 
Financial and Consumer Services Commission, New Brunswick (FCNB) 
 Investment Industry Regulatory Organization of Canada (IIROC) 
 Mutual Fund Dealers Association (MFDA)
 Financial Services Commission of Ontario
 Financial Institutions Commission - Province of British Columbia
 Cayman Islands - Cayman Islands Monetary Authority 
 Chile - Superintendencia de Valores y Seguros 
 China, People's Republic of:
 China Securities Regulatory Commission (CSRC)
 China Banking and Insurance Regulatory Commission (CBIRC)
 People's Bank of China (PBOC) 
 Colombia:
 Superintendencia Financiera de Colombia 
 National Directorate of Taxes and Customs (DIAN)
 Congo, the Democratic Republic of - Central Bank of Congo 
 Congo, The Republic of - Agence de Régulation des Transferts de Fonds (ARTF) 
 Costa Rica:
 Superintendencia General de Valores 
 Superintendencia General de Seguros (Costa Rica) 
 Côte d'Ivoire - Banque Centrale des Etats de l'Afrique de l'Ouest 
 Croatia:
 Croatian Financial Services Supervisory Agency 
 Croatian National Bank
 Cyprus:
 Central Bank of Cyprus 
 Cyprus Securities and Exchange Commission (CYSEC) 
 Cyprus Insurance Companies Control Service (ICCS)
 Czech Republic - Czech National Bank 
 Denmark - Financial Supervisory Authority (Denmark), (Finanstilsynet in Danish) 
 Dominica - Financial Service Unit of the Commonwealth of Dominica
 Dominican Republic:
 Banco Central de la Republica Dominica 
 Superintendencia de Bancos de la Republica Dominicana 
 Superintendencia del Mercado de Valores de la Republica Dominicana

E-I
 Ecuador - Superintendencia de Bancos 
 Egypt - Financial Regulatory Authority
 El Salvador
 Superintendencia del Sistema Financiero 
 Instituto De Garantía De Depósitos (IGD) 
 European Union:
 European Central Bank (ECB)
 European Banking Authority (EBA) 
 European Securities and Markets Authority (ESMA)
 European Insurance and Occupational Pensions Authority (EIOPA)
 European Systemic Risk Board (ESRB)
 Estonia:
 Financial Supervisory Authority of Estonia (Finantsinspektsioon in Estonian) 
 Bank of Estonia (Eesti Pank in Estonian) 
 Faroe Islands - Insurance Authority of the Faroe Islands (Tryggingareftirlitið in Faroese)  (For Insurance, Pension and mortgages all other finance is regulated by Financial Supervisory Authority (Denmark))
 Finland - Financial Supervisory Authority, (FIN-FSA Finanssivalvonta in Finnish) 
 France:
Financial Protection Regulatory Authority (France) (FPRA)
Autorité des marchés financiers (France) (AMF)
 Georgia - National Bank of Georgia 
 Germany - Federal Financial Supervisory Authority (BaFin - Bundesanstalt für Finanzdienstleistungsaufsicht) 
Ghana:
Securities and Exchange Commission (Ghana) (SEC) 
Bank of Ghana (BOG) 
 Gibraltar - Gibraltar Financial Services Commission (GFSC)
 Greece - Hellenic Capital Market Commission
 Grenada - Grenada International Financial Services Authority (GIFSA)
 Guatemala - Superintendencia de Bancos (SB)
 Guernsey - Guernsey Financial Services Commission 
 Honduras - National Banks and Securities Commission (Comisión Nacional de Bancos y Seguros in Spanish) 
 Hong Kong:
 Hong Kong Monetary Authority (HKMA) 
 Hong Kong Securities and Futures Commission (SFC) 
 Hong Kong Insurance Authority (IA) 
 Hong Kong Mandatory Provident Fund Schemes Authority (MPFA) 
 Hungary - Hungarian National Bank
 Iceland - Central Bank of Iceland 
 India:
 Reserve Bank of India (RBI) - central bank and primary regulator of banks, payment systems, and financial entities
 Banks Board Bureau (BBB)
 National Payments Corporation of India (NPCI)
 Deposit Insurance and Credit Guarantee Corporation (DICGC)
 Banking Codes and Standards Board of India (BCSBI)
 Securities and Exchange Board of India (SEBI)
 Forward Markets Commission (FMC)
 Insolvency and Bankruptcy Board of India (IBBI)
 Insurance Regulatory and Development Authority of India (IRDAI) 
 Pension Fund Regulatory and Development Authority (PFRDA)
 All India Financial Institutions
 National Bank for Agriculture and Rural Development (NBARD)
 Small Industries Development Bank of India (SIDB)
 National Housing Bank (NHB)
 Export-Import Bank of India (Ex-Im Bank)
 Indonesia:
 Financial Services Authority (Indonesia) (OJK) 
 Bank Indonesia 
 Indonesia Deposit Insurance Corporation (LPS)
 Ireland:
 Central Bank of Ireland 
 Irish Takeover Panel 
 Iran:
 Securities and Exchange Organization of Iran 
 Central Bank of Iran 
 Iraq - Iraq Securities Commission (ISC)
 Isle of Man - Isle of Man Financial Services Authority
 Israel - Israel Securities Authority (ISA) 
 Italy:
 Commissione Nazionale per le Società e la Borsa (CONSOB) 
 Institute for the Supervision of Insurance (ISVAP)

J-L
 Jamaica:
 Financial Services Commission (Jamaica) 
 Bank of Jamaica
 Japan:
 Financial Services Agency (FSA)
 Securities and Exchange Surveillance Commission (SESC)
 Jersey - Jersey Financial Services Commission 
 Jordan - Jordan Securities Commission 
 Kazakhstan:
 Agency of the Republic of Kazakhstan on Regulation and Supervision of Financial Market and Financial Organizations (Агентство Республики Казахстан по регулированию и надзору финансового рынка и финансовых организаций in Kazakh )
 Committee for the Control and Supervision of the Financial Market and Financial Organizations of the National Bank of the Republic of Kazakhstan 
 Astana Financial Services Authority
 Kenya - Capital Markets Authority (Kenya) 
 Kuwait:
 Central Bank of Kuwait (CBK) (بنك الكويت المركزي in Arabic) 
 Capital Markets Authority Kuwait (CMA) (هيئة أسواق المال - دولة الكويت in Arabic) 
 Korea, South:
 Financial Services Commission (FSC)
 Financial Supervisory Service (FSS)
 Latvia - Financial and Capital Market Commission 
 Lebanon - Banking Control Commission of Lebanon (BCCL) and Insurance Control Commission (ICC)
Lesotho - Central Bank of Lesotho
 Liechtenstein - Financial Market Authority (Liechtenstein) (FMA) 
 Lithuania - Bank of Lithuania 
 Luxembourg:
 Commission de Surveillance du Secteur Financier (CSSF) 
 Commissariat aux Assurances (CAA)

M-R
 Malaysia:
 Bank Negara Malaysia (BNM) 
 Securities Commission Malaysia (SC) 
 Labuan Financial Services Authority (Labuan FSA) 
 Malaysian Stock Exchange (Bursa)
 Malawi - Reserve Bank of Malawi (RBM) 
 Malta: 
 Malta Financial Services Authority (MFSA)
Central Bank of Malta
 Mauritania - Central Bank of Mauritania (BCM) 
 Mauritius: 
 Bank of Mauritius (BOM) 
 Financial Services Commission (FSC) 
 Mexico:
 Comisión Nacional Bancaria y de Valores 
 Comisión Nacional para la Protección y Defensa de los Usuarios de Servicios Financieros 
 Moldova - National Commission for Financial Markets 
 Montenegro - Insurance Supervision Agency 
 Montserrat - Montserrat Financial Services Commission 
 Mongolia: 
 Financial Regulatory Commission of Mongolia
 Central Bank of Mongolia
 Morocco -  (AMMC) 
 Nepal:
Nepal Rastra Bank (Central Bank of Nepal - Regulator and Supervisor of Banks and Financial Institutions)
 Beema Samiti (Regulator of Insurance Companies) 
 Securities Board Nepal (SEBON)
 Netherlands: 
 Netherlands Authority for the Financial Markets (AFM -  Financiële Markten in Dutch)
 De Nederlandsche Bank (DNB) 
 Netherlands Antilles - Bank of the Netherlands Antilles
 New Zealand - Financial Markets Authority (New Zealand)
 Nigeria:
Central Bank of Nigeria (CBN)
Securities and Exchange Commission (Nigeria)
National Insurance Commission (NAICOM) (Nigeria)
National Pension Commission (PENCOM) (Nigeria) 
 North Macedonia:
 Securities and Exchange Commission of the Republic of North Macedonia (MSEC) 
 National Bank of North Macedonia 
 Norway - Financial Supervisory Authority of Norway  (Finanstilsynet in Norwegian)
 Oman - Capital Market Authority (Oman) 
 Pakistan 
State Bank of Pakistan 
Securities and Exchange Commission Pakistan 
 Panama - Superintendencia del Mercado de Valores
 Papua New Guinea - Bank of Papua New Guinea
 Peru:
Superintendencia de Banca, Seguros y AFP (SBS)
Superintendencia del Mercado de Valores (SMV)
 Philippines:
 Philippine Securities and Exchange Commission (SEC) 
 Insurance Commission (Komisyon ng Seguro) 
 Bangko Sentral ng Pilipinas (Central Bank of the Philippines) 
 Philippine Deposit Insurance Corporation (PDIC) 
 Department of Finance (DOF)
 Philippine Stock Exchange (PSE)
 Bureau of Treasury
 Poland - Polish Financial Supervision Authority (KNF) 
 Portugal:
 Portuguese Securities Market Commission (CMVM) 
 Portuguese Insurance Regulator (ASF) 
 Qatar - Qatar Financial Centre Regulatory Authority (QFCRA) 
 Romania - Romanian Financial Supervisory Authority 
 Russia - Central Bank of Russia (CBR)

S-T
 Saint Lucia - Financial Sector Supervision Unit 
 Saint Kitts and Nevis:
 Financial Services Regulatory Commission 
 Nevis Financial Regulatory Services Commission 
 Saint Vincent and the Grenadines: 
 Financial Services Authority 
 Capital Market Association of the Eastern Caribbean (CMAEC) 
Samoa - Central Bank of Samoa
San Marino - Central Bank of San Marino (BCSM)
 Saudi Arabia: 
 Saudi Arabian Monetary Agency (SAMA) (مؤسسة النقد العربي السعودي in Arabic)- 
 Capital Market Authority (Saudi Arabia) (CMA) (هيئة السوق المالية in Arabic)
 Serbia - Securities Commission (Serbia) 
 Seychelles:
 Central Bank of Seychelles
 Seychelles Financial Services Authority (SFSA) 
 Singapore - Monetary Authority of Singapore (MAS)
 Slovakia - National Bank of Slovakia
 Slovenia - Securities Market Agency (ATVP Agencija za Trg Vrednostnih Papirjev)
 South Africa:
 South African Reserve Bank
 National Credit Regulator 
 Prudential Authority
 Financial Sector Conduct Authority
 Spain:
 Investment sector regulator - Spanish Securities Market Commission (Comisión Nacional del Mercado de Valores, CNMV) [MiFID] 
 Insurance sector regulator (life and general) - Dirección General de Seguros y Fondos de Pensiones (DGSFP)[IMD] 
 Banking sector regulator - Banco de España (BdE) 
 Sri Lanka:
 Central Bank of Sri Lanka 
 Securities and Exchange Commission of Sri Lanka 
 Swaziland - Capital Markets Development Unit (Central Bank of Swaziland) 
 Sweden - Financial Supervisory Authority (Sweden)
 Switzerland:
 Swiss Financial Market Supervisory Authority 
 Swiss National Bank 
 Swiss Takeover Board
 Taiwan - Financial Supervisory Commission
 Tanzania - Capital Markets and Securities Authority 
 Thailand:
Bank of Thailand (BOT)
 Office of the Securities and Exchange Commission, Thailand (Thai SEC)
 Office of Insurance Commission (OIC)
 Trinidad and Tobago - Central Bank of Trinidad and Tobago
 Trinidad and Tobago Securities and Exchange Commission
 Tunisia - Conseil du marché financier 
 Turkey:
 Banking Regulation and Supervision Agency of Turkey (BRSA - )
 Capital Markets Board of Turkey (CMB)

U-Z
 Uganda:
 Capital Markets Authority (Uganda) (CMA) 
 Insurance Regulatory Authority of Uganda 
 Ukraine - National Securities and Stock Market Commission (NSSMC) 
 United Arab Emirates:
 Mainland (Onshore): 
 Central Bank of the UAE (CBUAE)
 Securities and Commodities Authority  - (SCA) 
 Insurance Authority - (IA)
 Free Zones:
 Abu Dhabi: ADGM (Abu Dhabi Global Market) - Financial Services Regulatory Authority  - (FSRA)
 Dubai: DIFC (Dubai International Financial Center)  - Dubai Financial Services Authority (DFSA) 
 United Kingdom:
 Bank of England (BoE) 
 Prudential Regulation Authority (PRA) 
 Financial Conduct Authority (FCA) 
 Panel on Takeovers and Mergers (PANEL) 
 Financial Policy Committee (FPC) 
 Financial Reporting Council (FRC)
 United States:
 Banking Regulators
 Consumer Financial Protection Bureau (CFPB) - consumer compliance
 Federal Reserve System ("Fed")
 Federal Deposit Insurance Corporation (FDIC)
 Office of the Comptroller of the Currency (OCC)
 National Credit Union Administration (NCUA)
 Farm Credit Administration (FCA)
 Federal Financial Institutions Examination Council (FFIEC) - main umbrella group for US Federal banking authorities
 Conference of State Bank Supervisors (CSBS)  - main umbrella group representing US State and Territorial banking supervisors
 Securities Regulators
 Securities & Exchange Commission (SEC)
 Commodity Futures Trading Commission (CFTC) 
 Securities Investor Protection Corporation (SIPC)
 Financial Industry Regulatory Authority (FINRA) 
 Municipal Securities Rulemaking Board (MSRB)
 National Futures Association (NFA)
 Other Regulators
 Financial Stability Oversight Board (FSOC) - systemic risk
 Federal Housing Finance Agency (FHFA) - government sponsored housing finance 
 Financial Crimes Enforcement Network (FinCEN) - anti-money laundering
 National Association of Insurance Commissioners (NAIC) - insurance
 Each US state and territory generally has its own banking, insurance, and securities authorities
 Uruguay - Banco Central del Uruguay 
 Uzbekistan - Center for Coordination and Control over Functioning of Securities Market 
 Vatican City - Financial Information Authority
 Venezuela - Superintendencia Nacional de Valores (SNV) 
 Vietnam - State Securities Commission (SSC) 
 Zambia - Securities and Exchange Commission (Zambia) 
 Zimbabwe - Reserve Bank of Zimbabwe (RBZ)

See also
 Financial market
 Financial regulation
 Securities commission
 International Organization of Securities Commissions
 Legal Entity Identification for Financial Contracts
 List of stock exchanges
 List of company registers

References

External links
 Bank of International Settlements - Regulatory authorities and supervisory agencies

 
Business law
financial regulatory authorities by country
Public records
Financial
Finance lists